Fekrou Gabreselassie (born 20 October 1949) is an Ethiopian boxer. He competed in the men's light welterweight event at the 1972 Summer Olympics. At the 1972 Summer Olympics, he lost in his fight to Kyoji Shinohara of Japan.

References

1949 births
Living people
Ethiopian male boxers
Olympic boxers of Ethiopia
Boxers at the 1972 Summer Olympics
Place of birth missing (living people)
Light-welterweight boxers